Stephen Walker "Steve" Raby  (born 1958) is the former 2010 Democratic nominee for U.S. Representative for Alabama's 5th congressional district.

Early life and education
Raby was born in Huntsville and grew up in Harvest, where he still has a home on his family farm.  He attended Sparkman High School in Madison County. While in high school, he served as a United States Senate Page for Senator John Sparkman where he began his career in public service.  He graduated from Auburn University with a BS in Agricultural Economics, and an MS in Economics.

Business career
As a Legislative Aide and Chief of Staff for U.S. Senator Howell Heflin from 1984 until 1997, Raby worked on Northern Alabama issues such as Marshall Space Flight Center and Redstone Arsenal.

Returning to Alabama in 1997, Raby joined North Alabama-based Direct Communications while continuing his public service for four years as the Chairman of the Governor’s Task Force on Military Affairs, helping to develop a strategic plan for the state to grow military presence and increase contracting potential within Alabama. He is currently the President of Huntsville Direct Communications, which specializes in public relations, management of local issues, and counseling.

2010 U.S. Congressional campaign

Raby ran against Republican nominee Mo Brooks for the U.S. House (Alabama District 5), but was defeated by Brooks in the general election.

Raby announced his candidacy on February 9, 2010. He won the Democratic primary on June 1, 2010 against Taze Shepard, Mitchell Howie, and David Maker. By winning over 60% of the vote, no runoff was required. On August 4, Raby won the official endorsement from the Blue Dog Coalition, saying: "As I have stated throughout the campaign, my first priority as a Congressman will be to focus on jobs and growing the economy. We must balance the federal budget for our Nation to rebound economically. The Coalition is dedicated to financial stability and national security, and I will join the Blue Dogs in this bipartisan common sense effort."

As of late September 2010 Raby had raised about 20% more campaign funds than his Republican opponent, Mo Brooks.

On October 28, 2010 Raby gained the endorsement of the district's largest daily newspaper, The Huntsville Times. Raby ultimately lost the election to Brooks, garnering 42% of the vote. To date, he is the last Democrat to earn over 40% of the vote in the district.

Personal life
Steve and his wife, Denise, live in Huntsville, Alabama. They have two sons, Nathan and Keenan, in college. Raby is active with community service, including the Huntsville-Madison County Chamber of Commerce, the Tennessee Valley Corridor, the Association of the United States Army, and the Veterans Memorial Foundation.

References

External links
Steve Raby for Congress official campaign site
 
Campaign contributions at OpenSecrets
Steve Raby at OurCampaigns.com

1954 births
Alabama Democrats
Living people
Politicians from Huntsville, Alabama
Auburn University alumni
Political chiefs of staff
United States congressional aides